The twenty-first season of the American reality television series The Voice premiered on September 20, 2021, on NBC. Blake Shelton, Kelly Clarkson and John Legend returned as coaches for their twenty-first, eighth, and sixth seasons, respectively. Ariana Grande made her first appearance as a coach this season, replacing Nick Jonas. Meanwhile, Carson Daly returned for his twenty-first season as host.

At the season finale, Girl Named Tom, consisting of siblings Bekah, Caleb, and Joshua Liechty, was crowned the winner of this season, marking Kelly Clarkson's fourth win as a coach and the first instance of a group act winning the show, as well as the second time that the first (aired) act to audition would go on to win the entire season, following Todd Tilghman's win in season 18. Additionally, with Wendy Moten being named the runner-up, she is the oldest in the show's run, and along with Toneisha Harris (also from season 18), they are the highest-placing African-American female singers in the show's history.

The twenty-first season was also notable when Sasha Allen of Jim & Sasha Allen not only became the American version’s third openly transgender artist (after season fourteen's Angel Bonilla and season seventeen’s Dane Mautone of Dane & Stephanie) and second transgender male to turn a chair on the show, but also became the American version’s first transgender artist to have progressed to the Live shows.

Panelists

Coaches and host 
In March 2021, NBC announced there would be a change in the coaches for this season. Blake Shelton, Kelly Clarkson, and John Legend all returned for their twenty-first, eighth, and sixth seasons, respectively, with Ariana Grande making her first appearance as a coach in this season. Carson Daly returned for his twenty-first season as the host.

Advisors 
In August 2021, the advisors for the Battles were revealed, who were: Jason Aldean for Team Kelly, Camila Cabello for Team Legend, Kristin Chenoweth for Team Ariana and Dierks Bentley for Team Blake.

Mega mentor 
Ed Sheeran serves as the mega mentor for this season during the Knockouts. He was previously a Battle advisor for Team Christina in season five.

Teams

Blind auditions 
The blind auditions began airing on September 20, 2021. In each audition, an artist sings their piece in front of the coaches whose chairs are facing the audience. If a coach is interested to work with the artist, they will press their button to face the artist. If a singular coach presses the button, the artist automatically becomes part of their team. If multiple coaches turn, they will compete for the artist, who will decide which team they will join. Each coach has one "block" to prevent another coach from getting an artist, with only one block permitted to be used per blind audition. Each coach ends up with 12 artists by the end of the blind auditions, creating a total of 48 artists advancing to the battles.

The coaches performed a mash-up of "Hold On, I'm Comin'" (John Legend & Blake Shelton) and "Respect" (Kelly Clarkson & Ariana Grande) at the start of the show.

Battles 
The battles began airing on October 11, 2021. The advisors for this round were Jason Aldean for Team Kelly, Camila Cabello for Team Legend, Kristin Chenoweth for Team Ariana, and Dierks Bentley for Team Blake. 

In this round, the coaches pit two of their artists in a singing match and then select one of them to advance to the next round. Losing artists may be "stolen" by another coach, becoming new members of their team, or can be saved by their coach, remaining a part of their original team. Multiple coaches can attempt to steal an artist, resulting in a competition for the artist, who will ultimately decide which team they will go to. Additionally, their original coach can compete for their artist if they attempt to save them. There will be no four-way knockout in this season meaning that the artists saved by their coach will go to the regular Knockouts. 

At the end of this round, eight artists will remain on each team; six will be battle winners, and one from a steal and a save, respectively. In total, 32 artists advance to the knockouts.

It was revealed that for the Live Playoffs Wildcard, one previously eliminated artist from each team has the chance to be voted via Twitter to earn a place in the Top 13 (see Voice Comeback).

Knockouts 
The Knockouts began airing on October 25, 2021. Ed Sheeran served as the mega mentor for this season's knockouts.

In this round, each coach pairs two of their artists in a singing match. The artists themselves will select the song they will sing in the round. The coach will then select one of the artists to advance to the Live Playoffs. Each coach can steal one losing artist from another team but the coaches do not have the ability to save their artists during the Knockouts. At the end of this round, four artists will remain on each team whilst four artists will be stolen, creating a total of twenty artists advancing to the Live Playoffs.

It was revealed that for the Live Playoffs Wildcard, one previously eliminated artist from each team has the chance to be voted via Twitter to earn a place in the Top 13 (see Voice Comeback).

Voice Comeback 
Following the conclusion of the Knockouts, it was revealed that one previously eliminated artist from each team has the chance to return to the competition. Each artist will be put up in a poll via Twitter where viewers may vote by tweeting or retweeting. The winner participates in the Live Playoffs Wildcard, having the chance to earn a place in the Top 13.

To participate in this poll, Ariana and Kelly selected Vaughn Mugol and Aaron Hines, respectively, who were eliminated in the Battles, while Blake and John selected Hailey Green and Samara Brown, respectively, who were eliminated in the Knockouts.

Live shows

Week 1: Top 20 – Playoffs (Nov. 8–9) 
The Live Playoffs comprised episodes 15 and 16. On Monday, the Top 20 artists performed live for their chance at a spot in the Top 13. On Tuesday, in the live results show, two artists from each team advanced based on the public's vote, and each coach got to save one of their own artists. The remaining artists from each team with the highest overnight vote then competed for the Wild card. In addition, Vaughn Mugol, via The Voice Comeback, competed in the Wild card as well.

Hailey Mia won the Wildcard and advanced to the Top 13. This is the third time, following the fifteenth and seventeenth seasons, that Kelly Clarkson has entered the Top 13 with four artists on her team.

Week 2: Top 13 (Nov. 15–16) 
This week's theme was “Dedications”. The three artists who received the fewest votes competed for the Instant Save on the results show. There was only one artist in the bottom three receiving the instant save, eliminating two artists from the competition. Also, this season restored the previous elimination format last used in season 17, which does not guarantee a coach will have an artist in the finale.

As the studio performances start to be released, the trio Girl Named Tom becomes the first contestant this season to crack the Top 10 on iTunes Songs Chart. Their cover of "Dust in the Wind" hit #10 at the close of the voting window.

Week 3: Top 11 (Nov. 22–23)
This week was "Fan Week" wherein the viewers selected the songs the remaining artists would perform. At the results show, the two artists with the fewest public votes competed for the sole instant save for that week, eliminating one artist. 

Once again, Girl Named Tom reached Top 10 on iTunes Songs Chart at #9. They are also the only contestant placing in the top 100 (for the second consecutive week).

Week 4: Top 10 (Nov. 29–30) 
Week four is "Challenge Week", wherein the remaining artists sang songs "outside of their genre." The three artists who receive the fewest votes will compete for the Instant Save on the results show. One will instantly be saved eliminating two artists from the competition.

No performance reached the top 10 on iTunes this week. However, for the first time this season, there are four contestants who cracked the top 100, with their highest charting being Girl Named Tom at #12, Jim & Sasha Allen at #33, Wendy Moten at #45, and Paris Winningham at #53.

The three artists who landed in the bottom three – Holly Forbes, Jeremy Rosado, and Jershika Maple – were all originally from Team Kelly.

Week 5: Top 8 – Semifinals (Dec. 6–7) 
The Top 8 performed on Monday, with the results following on Tuesday. The four artists with the most votes automatically moved on to the finale with the remaining four artists, competing in the Instant Save for the fifth and final spot in the finale.

In addition to their solo song, each artist performed a 90s duet with another act. The duets were not available to purchase on iTunes.

This week, Girl Named Tom's cover of "River" marked the first The Voice studio performance to hit #1 on iTunes Overall Chart since the eighteenth season. Additionally, four other contestants reached the top 100: Wendy Moten at #17, Hailey Mia at #56, Joshua Vacanti at #90, and Paris Winningham at #96. Jim & Sasha Allen and Jershika Maple just missed out on the top 100 at #104 and #106, respectively.

With the advancements of Girl Named Tom and Hailey Mia, this is the first time that a female coach (Kelly Clarkson) has had two artists on her team advance to the finale, and with Girl Named Tom's advancement, in particular, the first time that a trio has advanced to the finale, as well. Also, this is the first season that not only one but two coaches have multiple artists represented in the finale (Kelly and Blake with 2 each). In addition, Hailey Mia became the first Wild card Instant Save winner to make it to the finale. Additionally, with the elimination of Jim & Sasha Allen, Ariana Grande no longer has any artists left on her team, marking the first instance of a coach not being represented in the finale since the sixteenth season, as well as the first time since the thirteenth season that a debuting coach was not represented in the finale.

Week 6: Finale (Dec. 13–14) 
The Top 5 finalists performed two songs on Monday, as well as a duet with their coach on Tuesday. This is the second consecutive season in which contestants aren't allowed to perform original songs on the finale.

Girl Named Tom was the only contestant that managed to get both finale songs reach Top 10 on iTunes at #1 and #7 (along with their Top 13 and Top 8 songs at #3 and #8). This is the second time a contestant have 4 songs in the top 10 all at the same time (after Jake Hoot in season 17). All their other songs also got back on the Top 100 overall. In addition, Wendy Moten charted at #11 and #70 (with her Top 8 song at #85), Paris Winningham hit #25, and Hailey Mia reached #33. Coach duets were not released to purchase this season. 

Girl Named Tom was announced as the winner, making them the first-ever trio to win The Voice. Also, Kelly Clarkson got her fourth win, surpassing Adam Levine's three wins and becoming the second most winningest coach. She also has a winning percentage of 50%, winning 4 of her 8 seasons. This is tied with Usher for the best winning percentage of any coach. Clarkson is also the first female coach to win four times.

This season is the second time that three stolen artists advanced to the finale, with the eighth season being the first time. Jershika Maple is originally from Team Kelly, Hailey Mia from Ariana's team, and Paris Winningham formerly from John's team.

Elimination chart

Overall

Per team

Ratings

References

External links

2021 American television seasons
Season 21